John Semple Galbraith (November 10, 1916 – June 10, 2003) was a British Empire historian concentrating on Canada (The Hudson's Bay Company) and South and East Africa. He served as chancellor of the University of California San Diego, from 1964 to 1968.

He was a native of Glasgow; his family emigrated to the United States in 1926. He received a BA from Miami University in Ohio in 1938, and Ph.D. in 1943 at the University of Iowa, working under his dissertation adviser, C. W. de Kiewiet. He served as an Army historical officer for the Third Air Force until 1946, and assumed a professorship at UCLA in 1948.

He was the second chancellor of the relatively new University of California San Diego. As a condition of accepting the chancellorship in 1964, he secured a promise from UC president Clark Kerr that a library would be built and that UCSD would receive full standing as an autonomous university of the system. The Geisel Library is considered his legacy at UCSD.

Galbraith's published work includes: Mackinnon and East Africa 1878–1895: A Study in the 'New Imperialism, Cambridge Commonwealth Series (Nov 22, 1972); The little emperor: Governor Simpson of the Hudson's Bay company (1976); The Hudson's Bay Company as an imperial factor, 1821–1869 (1957); Crown and Charter: The Early Years of the British South Africa Company, Perspectives on Southern Africa (Aug 1975); Reluctant Empire: British Policy on the South African Frontier, 1834–1854 (Jun 1963).
 
He left the campus for a visiting fellowship at Cambridge in 1968, and subsequently resumed teaching at UCLA.

References

External links 
 John Semple Galbraith Papers MSS 41. Special Collections & Archives, UC San Diego Library.

Miami University alumni
University of Iowa alumni
Chancellors of the University of California, San Diego
University of California, Los Angeles faculty
2003 deaths
20th-century American historians
American male non-fiction writers
1916 births
Historians from California
20th-century American male writers
British emigrants to the United States
20th-century American academics